Charles D. Brown II is an American physicist and postdoctoral researcher at the University of California, Berkeley, studying many-body physics of ultracold atoms in optical lattices. Brown is also a lead organiser of #BlackInPhysics week, a campaign to recognise and amplify the scientific contributions of Black physicists.

Early life and education 
Brown studied physics at the University of Minnesota, Twin Cities, receiving a Bachelor of Science in 2013. During his undergraduate studies, he carried out a 10-week research placement at the University of Chicago supported by the National Science Foundation.

He obtained a PhD in physics from the Yale University in 2019, focusing on quantum fluid dynamics. His thesis investigated the optomechanical properties of superfluid liquid helium drops. Specifically, he studied the interaction between optical modes and surface vibrations of magnetically levitated superfluid drops. Brown received the Leigh Paige Award (2013) and the D. Allan Bromley Fellowship for Graduate Research in Physics (2017) from Yale. He was also awarded a Ford Foundation Dissertation Fellowship in 2018.

During his graduate studies, Brown was a student representative on the Board of the National Society of Black Physicists. He also co-founded the Yale League of Black Scientists.

Research career 
In 2019, Brown joined the Department of Physics at University of California, Berkeley, where he studies ultracold atoms trapped in two-dimensional optical lattices. His research focuses on many-body physics phenomena of atoms in optical lattices with kagome geometries.
Brown will join the Department of Physics at Yale University as an Assistant Professor in January 2023.

Advocacy 
Brown was one of the organisers of the first #BlackInPhysics Week, held between 25–31 October 2020 alongside Jessica Esquivel and Eileen Gonzales. The campaign was inspired by the success of Black Birders Week, and set out to increase the visibility and recognition of Black physicists and their contributions to physics, as well as providing a community of collaboration and support for Black physicists worldwide. The initiative gained widespread media coverage and support from organisations such as Nature Physics, Physics World, Physics Today, the American Institute of Physics.
Brown received the 2021–2022 Chancellor's Award for Civic Engagement from the University of California, Berkeley.

Brown is also a member of the National Society of Black Physicists.

References 

Living people
American physicists
University of California, Berkeley people
University of Minnesota College of Science and Engineering alumni
Yale Graduate School of Arts and Sciences alumni
African-American scientists
Quantum physicists
Year of birth missing (living people)
21st-century African-American people
African-American physicists